Novorechye is a rural locality (a selo) and the administrative center of Novorechenskoye Rural Settlement, Chernyansky District, Belgorod Oblast, Russia. The population was 507 as of 2010. There are 3 streets.

Geography 
Novorechye is located 36 km northeast of Chernyanka (the district's administrative centre) by road. Baklanovka is the nearest rural locality.

References 

Rural localities in Chernyansky District